Ganginchugin Hulgana (born 15 January 1929) is a Mongolian chess player who holds the title of Woman FIDE Master (WFM, 1992). She is a six-time winner of the Mongolian Women's Chess Championship (1958, 1962, 1972, 1976, 1978, 1982).

Biography
From the end of 1950s to the begin to 1980s Ganginchugin Hulgana was one of the leading Mongolian women's chess players. She six time won Mongolian Women's Chess Championship: 1958, 1962, 1972, 1976, 1978, and 1982.

Ganginchugin Hulgana played for Mongolia in the Women's Chess Olympiads:
 In 1963, at first board in the 2nd Chess Olympiad (women) in Split (+4, =2, -8),
 In 1972, at first board in the 5th Chess Olympiad (women) in Skopje (+3, =3, -5),
 In 1982, at first board in the 10th Chess Olympiad (women) in Lucerne (+4, =5, -5).

In 1992, she awarded the Women FIDE Master (WFM) title.

References

External links

Ganginchugin Hulgana chess games at 365Chess.com

1929 births
Mongolian female chess players
Chess Woman FIDE Masters
Chess Olympiad competitors
Living people
20th-century Mongolian women